Lisa Young (born 3 January 1966) is a British gymnast. She competed in six events at the 1984 Summer Olympics. Young attended Louisiana State University and competed for their Gymnastics team in 1987.  Young helped LSU to a 7th place finish at the 1987 NCAA Gymnastics Championships and was a letter winner for the 1987 season.

Competitive history

References

External links
 

1966 births
Living people
British female artistic gymnasts
Olympic gymnasts of Great Britain
Gymnasts at the 1984 Summer Olympics
Sportspeople from Shropshire